Adam Jamieson (born 12 February 1996) is a Canadian professional racing cyclist, who currently rides for UCI Continental team . He rode in the men's team pursuit at the 2016 UCI Track Cycling World Championships. He also won a bronze medal at the 2015 Pan American Games in Toronto in the team pursuit event.

Major results

Road
2012
 3rd Time trial, National Junior Road Championships
2013
 7th Overall Le Trophée Centre Morbihan
1st Young rider classification
2015
 3rd Overall Green Mountain Stage Race
2016
 6th Grand Prix des Marbriers
2017
 Challenge du Prince
4th Trophée Princier
10th Trophée de l'Anniversaire
 Les Challenges de la Marche Verte
10th GP Oued Eddahab
10th GP Sakia El Hamra

Track
2016
 2016–17 UCI World Cup
1st  Team pursuit – Apeldoorn (with Jay Lamoureux, Aidan Caves, Bayley Simpson & Ed Veal)
 2nd  Team pursuit, Pan American Championships
2017
 1st  Team pursuit (with Bayley Simpson, Evan Burtnik & Derek Gee), National Championships
2018
 1st  Team pursuit (with Michael Foley, Evan Burtnik & Derek Gee), National Championships

References

External links
 

1996 births
Living people
Canadian male cyclists
Sportspeople from Barrie
Canadian track cyclists
Cyclists at the 2015 Pan American Games
Pan American Games bronze medalists for Canada
Pan American Games medalists in cycling
Cyclists at the 2018 Commonwealth Games
Commonwealth Games medallists in cycling
Commonwealth Games bronze medallists for Canada
Medalists at the 2015 Pan American Games
Cyclists from Ontario
21st-century Canadian people
Medallists at the 2018 Commonwealth Games